Bad Motherfucken 40 O-Z is the second full-length album by the Red Aunts.  It was released in 1994 by Sympathy for the Record Industry.

Track listing
"Silver Moon Motel" – 2:21
"Batman A-Go-Go" – 2:05
"Terri Man" – 1:36
"Die Baby" – 1:53
"Wasted" – 1:04
"My Impala '65" – 3:08
"Brian Has A Car" – 1:52
"Baby Tough Luck" – 2:23
"Ice Tea" – 2:54
"Smoke" – 0:25
"Monsterfucker-Mothertrucker" – 3:58

References

Red Aunts albums
1994 albums